Dammartin-en-Goële ( or ) is a commune in the Seine-et-Marne department in the Île-de-France region in north-central France.

Geography
It is well situated on a hill forming part of the plateau of the Goële, and is known as Dammartin-en-Goële to distinguish it from Dammartin-sur-Tigeaux, a small commune in the same department.

History
Dammartin is historically important as the seat of a county of which the holders played a considerable part in French history. The earliest recorded count of Dammartin was a certain Hugh, who made himself master of the town in the 10th century; but his dynasty was replaced by another family in the 11th century. Reynald I, count of Dammartin (d. 1227), who was one of the coalition crushed by King Philip Augustus at the battle of Bouvines (1214), left two co-heiresses, of whom the elder, Maud (Matilda or Mahaut), married Philip Hurepel, son of Philip Augustus, and the second, Alix, married Jean de Trie, in whose line the county was reunited after the death of Philip Hurepel's son Alberic. The county passed, through heiresses, to the houses of Fayel and Nanteuil, and in the 15th century was acquired by Antoine de Chabannes (d. 1488), one of the favorites of King Charles VII, by his marriage with Marguerite, heiress of Reynald V of Nanteuil-Aci and Marie of Dammartin. This Antoine de Chabannes, count of Dammartin in right of his wife, fought under the standard of Joan of Arc, became a leader of the Ecorcheurs, took part in the war of the public weal against Louis XI, and then fought for him against the Burgundians. The collegiate church at Dammartin was founded by him in 1480, and his tomb and effigy are in the chancel.

His son, Jean de Chabannes, left three heiresses, of whom the second left a daughter who brought the county to Philippe de Boulainvilliers, by whose heirs it was sold in 1554 to the dukes of Montmorency. In the 16th century and later, an estate here called La Tuillerie was owned by Matthieu Coignet and his heirs. In 1632 the county was confiscated by Louis XIII and bestowed on the Prince of Condé.

Dammartin-en-Goële siege
On 9 January 2015, French interior minister Bernard Cazeneuve confirmed that a major operation was under way in Dammartin-en-Goële where police helicopters were  deployed. This related to police attempts to capture Saïd and Chérif Kouachi, the main suspects in the Charlie Hebdo shooting. The gunmen were within a printing business called CTD and had taken a hostage. The brothers were eventually killed in a gunfight with French police.

Demographics
The population of the town in 2019 was 10,355. Inhabitants of Dammartin-en-Goële are called Dammartinois.

See also
Communes of the Seine-et-Marne department
Charlie Hebdo shooting

References

External links

Official website 
1999 Land Use, from IAURIF (Institute for Urban Planning and Development of the Paris-Île-de-France région) 

Communes of Seine-et-Marne
Seine-et-Marne communes articles needing translation from French Wikipedia